Jens Thomas Erik Vestin (born June 29, 1989) is a Swedish professional ice hockey defenseman currently playing for Färjestad BK in the Swedish Hockey League (SHL).

He made his debut playing for Modo Hockey in the Elitserien in the 2007–08 season. His younger brother, John, also plays professionally and was formerly a teammate at Modo and Timrå IK.

Awards and honours

References

External links

1989 births
Living people
IF Björklöven players
Espoo Blues players
Färjestad BK players
Modo Hockey players
IF Sundsvall Hockey players
Swedish ice hockey defencemen
Timrå IK players